Datu Salipada Khalid Pendatun (December 3, 1912 – January 27, 1985) was a Filipino lawyer, military officer, and politician, being the first Filipino Muslim in history to hold these offices.

Early life and education 
Better known as “Sali” to friends, he was born in Pikit, Cotabato, on December 3, 1912. He completed his elementary and high school education in Cotabato, obtained his Associate in arts degree in 1934 and Bachelor of Laws degree in 1938, both from the University of the Philippines, and passed the bar examination also in 1938.

Contributions 

He fought against the Japanese. Pendatun was from Cotabato-Maguindanao. The group he formed was called the Bolo Battalion, which evolved into the larger group, Muslim-Christian Guerrilla Movement and later, the Cotabato-Bukidnon Force.

During his time as a politician, especially when he was the governor of the then undivided Cotabato province, Cotabato province was by then the most prosperous province in the country, serving it as its "rice basket", with its capital bearing the same name was second only to Davao City as the most populous and economically prosperous city in Mindanao. Several towns were born in the province, and a number of them, i.e. Kidapawan, Buayan (now General Santos), Marbel, Tacurong, and some others flourished and became economically prosperous that they become cities several years later. The province was also exceptionally peaceful before the Muslim insurgencies in Mindanao in the 1970s.

Together with former Senator Lorenzo Tañada, he was among the other 22 senators who voted against then President Manuel A. Roxas Amnesty Proclamation for the collaborators of World War II. During his six-year term in the Senate, Senator Pendatun was chairman of the following important committees: Army, Navy and Military Pensions; Corporations, Banks and Franchises; and Special Organized Provinces.

During World War 2, as a USAFFE officer, Pendatun organized and commanded the 102nd Regiment under the 101st Division of the Philippine Army/ Constabulary from 1942 to 1943 in the following operations. Preventing the total destruction of the regiment during the Japanese invasion of Mindanao in early 1942. Launching a guerilla assault on Japanese garrison in Pikit, Cotabato in September 1942. Leading a raid on the Japanese garrison at Kabacan, Cotabato on October 25, 1942. Eliminating the Japanese garrison at Kitaotao, Bukidnon on December 4, 1942. The rescue of Filipino Prisoners of War at Casisang, Bukidnon on December 24, 1942... And for leading a two-month siege on a Japanese garrison at Malaybalay, Bukidnon on January 11, 1943. For his war time accomplishment, later promoted to Brigadier General, Pendatun was awarded the Distinguished Conduct Star, the second highest military decoration given to AFP Personnel.

Later Pendatun became Provincial Governor of Cotabato (1945), Senator (1946-1951), President Elpidio Quirino's technical adviser (1950-1953), Congressman for Cotabato (1957-1972), and Assemblyman at the Interim Batasang Pambansa from Maguindanao (1978-1985). He had also served as official member to various international conferences, including the United Nations in Paris and New York and represented the Philippine Government at the inauguration of the Indonesian Independence in Jakarta in 1949.

Death
Pendatun died on January 27, 1985, at the Philippine Heart Center in Quezon City after figuring in a road accident.

Legacy 
The town of General Salipada K. Pendatun, Maguindanao, Pendatun Ave. in Maharlika Village, Taguig City, and the Philippine National Police regional headquarters in Parang, Maguindanao were named after him.

References 

Keats, J., 1963, The Fought Alone, Philadelphia: J.B. Lippincott, pp. 124–5 

1912 births
1985 deaths
Independent politicians in the Philippines
History of the Philippines (1898–1946)
Members of the House of Representatives of the Philippines from Cotabato
Senators of the 1st Congress of the Philippines
People from Cotabato
People from Maguindanao
University of the Philippines alumni
Filipino Muslims
Paramilitary Filipinos
World War II Philippine resistance members
Deputy Speakers of the House of Representatives of the Philippines
Members of the Batasang Pambansa
Road incident deaths in the Philippines